UFC Fight Night: Swanson vs. Lobov (also known as UFC Fight Night 108) was a mixed martial arts event produced by the Ultimate Fighting Championship held on April 22, 2017, at Bridgestone Arena in Nashville, Tennessee.

Background
A featherweight bout between Cub Swanson and Artem Lobov headlined the event.

A welterweight bout between former UFC Middleweight Championship challenger Demian Maia and future UFC Welterweight Championship challengerJorge Masvidal was initially targeted to headline this event. However it was moved to UFC 211.

At the weigh-ins, Marcos Rogério de Lima came in at 210 lb, four pounds over the light heavyweight limit of 206 lb. As a result, he was fined 30% of his purse, which will go to his opponent Ovince Saint Preux and the bout proceeded at a catchweight.

Results

Bonus awards
The following fighters were awarded $50,000 bonuses:
Fight of the Night: Cub Swanson vs. Artem Lobov
Performance of the Night: Mike Perry and Brandon Moreno

See also
List of UFC events
2017 in UFC

References

UFC Fight Night

Mixed martial arts in Tennessee
Sports competitions in Nashville, Tennessee
2017 in sports in Tennessee
2017 in mixed martial arts
April 2017 sports events in the United States
Events in Nashville, Tennessee